Tethyspira is a monotypic genus of sponges belonging to the family Dictyonellidae. The only species is Tethyspira spinosa.

The species is found in Western Europe.

References

Heteroscleromorpha
Monotypic sponge genera